Korpiloi or Corpili is the name of a Thracian tribe that was located below the Brenae.

References

See also
Thracian tribes

Ancient tribes in Thrace
Ancient tribes in the Balkans
Thracian tribes